The Portland Puppet Museum is a puppet museum founded and curated by Steven Overton, located in Portland, Oregon's Sellwood-Moreland neighborhood. The museum was established in 2012, and has been described as one of the city's "most unconventional" museums.

See also

 List of museums in Portland, Oregon

References

External links
 
 
 

2012 establishments in Oregon
Museums established in 2012
Museums in Portland, Oregon
Puppet museums in the United States
Sellwood-Moreland, Portland, Oregon